Bud is a botanical term referring to an undeveloped or embryonic shoot.

Bud may also refer to:

Companies 
 Budweiser, a global pale lager brand
 Bud Industries, a manufacturer and supplier of electronics enclosures
 BUD, ticker symbol of Anheuser-Busch InBev on the New York Stock Exchange

Places
 Bud, Indiana, a small town in the United States
 Bud, West Virginia, a census-designated place in the United States
 Bud, Wisconsin, an unincorporated community in the United States
 Bud, Norway, a village

People
 Bud (nickname), a list of people
 Bud (surname)

Fictional characters 
 Bud (Saint Seiya), in the anime series Saint Seiya
 Bud Bundy, on the TV series Married with Children
 Bud Roberts, on the TV series JAG
 Bud Compson, on the TV series Arthur
 James "Bud" Anderson Jr., on the TV series Father Knows Best
 Larry "Bud" Melman, on Late Night with David Letterman and Late Show with David Letterman, portrayed by Calvert DeForest
 Bud Stamper, in the film Splendor in the Grass
 Kenny, a character on The Cosby Show, nicknamed Bud
 Bud Gleeful, a character in the animated series, Gravity Falls
 Bud Budiovitch, a character in the animated series, Space Goofs

Other uses
 Hurricane Bud (disambiguation), several hurricanes 
 Buds (The Stems album), 1991
 Buds (Ovlov album), 2021
 Basic Underwater Demolition or "BUD/S", a military specialization within the United States Navy SEALs
 Big ugly dish, slang term for a large satellite dish used to receive satellite television signals on the C band
 Black Urine Disease, a defect in a metabolic enzyme which causes urine to turn black
 BUD, IATA code for Budapest Ferenc Liszt International Airport (formerly Budapest Ferihegy), serving Budapest, Hungary
 bud, ISO 639 code for the Ntcham language, spoken in Togo and Ghana
 Bud (dog), mascot of the first successful automobile trip across the United States

See also
Budd (disambiguation)
Budding (disambiguation)
Buddy (disambiguation)
Nanobud